Just Barbara is an Australian television series which aired in Melbourne on ABC during 1961. 

Starring U.S. entertainer Barbara Virgil, it was a half-hour variety series. Regulars in the series included Joe Jenkins, Abe Jensen, and the ABC Melbourne Dance Band.

References

External links
Just Barbara on IMDb

1961 Australian television series debuts
1961 Australian television series endings
Black-and-white Australian television shows
English-language television shows
Australian variety television shows
Australian Broadcasting Corporation original programming